Thourio (Greek: Θούριο) may refer to:

Thourio, Boeotia, a village in Boeotia, Greece
Thourio, Evros, a village in the Evros regional unit, Greece

See also

Thourios, a famous poem written by Rigas Feraios
Thouria, a village in Messenia, Greece